Pongpet Thongklet (born September 7, 1995), simply known as Jib. He is a professional footballer from Chiang Mai, Thailand. He currently plays for Ubon UMT United  in the Thai League 1.

References

1995 births
Living people
Pongpet Thongklet
Pongpet Thongklet
Association football midfielders
Association football forwards
Pongpet Thongklet
Pongpet Thongklet
Pongpet Thongklet
Pongpet Thongklet
Thai expatriate footballers